Andrea Gmür-Schönenberger (born 18 July 1964) is a Swiss politician from The Centre, formerly of the Christian Democratic People's Party of Switzerland.

References

See also 

 List of members of the Swiss Council of States (2019–2023)

1964 births
Living people
Christian Democratic People's Party of Switzerland politicians

21st-century Swiss politicians
21st-century Swiss women politicians
Members of the National Council (Switzerland)
The Centre politicians